Gornja Maoča is a village in northeastern Bosnia that territorially belongs to the Srebrenik municipality, Tuzla Canton in the Federation of Bosnia and Herzegovina. It is in the Majevic mountain range, located directly south from the village of Maoča. The name of the village can be translated as "Upper Maoča".

Geography 
Gornja Maoča is a mountainous village located in Majevica, a low mountain range in northeastern Bosnia.

History 
The village was formerly known as Karavlasi. In 1944 a massacre that was operated by members of the 13th Waffen Mountain Division of the SS Handschar (1st Croatian) resulted in the killing of 25 people. The victims were of Boyash descent. 

After the Bosnian War in the 1990s it was populated by foreign and domestic Wahhabists, the majority of whom participated in the war as members of the Bosnian mujahideen (El Mudžahid).

Alleged links to extremism
After being the focus of a lot of local and international media attention, allegations of extremist links and potential terrorist hideout and logistical base and "launching pad", issue culminated in winter 2010.
Upon visit in November 2009 FBI Director Robert Mueller conveyed his and US government concerns about Wahhabis in the village of Gornja Maoča to Bosnia and Herzegovina security chiefs. On 2 February 2010 village was raided by "hundreds" of police officers from 11 different law enforcement agencies. Action lasted for ten hours and resulted with "seven people" being arrested and the seizure of "some arms and ammunition", several cell phones and computers were also seized, as well as some audio and video material.

By taking into account extent of the operation, and media frenzy around the village and consequent raid itself, the result was deemed unimpressive: as U.S. diplomats familiar with the case put it afterwards, and according to Radio Free Europe/Radio Liberty (RFE/RL): 
"(B)ased on the stuff police are pulling out of there, the Salafis from Gornja Maoca do seem a bit like amateurs."

However, following these events around Gornja Maoča the German government, until then adamant in opposing visa liberalization for Bosnia, expressed its readiness to intensify assistance to government and security agencies, so that following European Commission report can be positive and Bosnia granted a non-visa regime.

See also 
 Ošve
 Donja Bočinja

References 
Notes

News reports

External links 
The VICE Guide to the Balkans - Part 5 
B92 - News - Bosnian police arrest Wahhabi leader

Populated places in Srebrenik
Wahhabism